Shefa Gold (born 1954 or 1955) is an American rabbi, scholar, and director of C-DEEP, The Center for Devotional, Energy and Ecstatic Practice in Jemez Springs, New Mexico. Gold is a teacher of chant, Jewish mysticism, Jewish prayer and spirituality who Rabbi Mike Comins described in 2010 as "a pioneer in the ecstatic practice of Jewish chant." Her chants have been used in synagogues, minyanim, and street protests, perhaps her most well-known being "Ozi V'zimrat Yah". Combining traditional Jewish liturgical music with Hebrew chant, she has worked to cultivate Jewish gratitude practice. Her "Flavors of Gratefulness" mobile app has 79 different chants for the morning prayer Modeh Ani (feminine "Modah Ani") as of December 31, 2020.

Prior to becoming a rabbi, Gold was a musician. She said in a 2013 interview "what I was really trying to do with my music was create sacred space. I felt how powerful music is in opening hearts." During rabbinical school she took time off to study Zen meditation practices including chant and co-lead a Rosh Hashanah service at a retreat led by Thich Nhat Hanh at the Omega Institute in 1993 as many participants were Jewish. By the time Gold was ordained as a rabbi by the Reconstructionist Rabbinical College in 1996 she had integrated Hebrew chant into her spiritual practice and ultimately into her rabbinate. She is a leader within Aleph: the Alliance for Jewish Renewal and received semicha from Rabbi Zalman Schachter-Shalomi. Through a program called Kol Zimra, Gold has trained rabbis, cantors, and lay leaders in Hebrew chant practices. According to one Jewish Telegraphic Agency article, nearly all interest in Jewish chanting today can be traced back to Gold. She was included in Letty Cottin Pogrebin's 2007 list The Other Fifty Rabbis in America, and in a 2015 list of "America's most inspiring rabbis" by The Forward, and has been quoted in articles that discuss the intersection of New Age/Spirituality and Judaism.

Gold has produced ten albums and her liturgies have been published in several prayerbooks.

She is the author of several books on deepening spiritual awareness through sacred chant and meditation.

Gold's work was featured in the book Stalking Elijah: Adventures with Today's Jewish Mystical Masters by Rodger Kamenetz.

In 2017, Gold was one of the rabbis who signed a statement by Jewish Veg encouraging veganism for all Jews.

Gold has described Hebrew chant as effective for healing and transforming people of different religions, not just adherents of Judaism.

Selected publications
 Torah Journeys: The Inner Path to the Promised Land 
 In the Fever of Love: An Illumination of The Song of Songs 
 The Magic of Hebrew Chant: Healing the Spirit, Transforming the Mind, Deepening Love 
 Are We There Yet?: Travel as a Spiritual Practice

References 

American Jewish Renewal rabbis
American Reconstructionist rabbis
Jewish Renewal women rabbis
Reconstructionist women rabbis

21st-century American rabbis
Living people

1950s births
Year of birth uncertain